Seibi may refer to:

, university in Fukuchiyama, Kyoto, Japan
, landscape garden in Hirakawa, Aomori Prefecture, Japan